John Caldwell (1757 – November 19, 1804) was a Kentucky politician, state senator, and the second lieutenant governor of Kentucky serving under Governor Christopher Greenup.

He was elected to the Kentucky State Senate in 1792, and was later elected the second lieutenant governor of Kentucky in 1804. Caldwell died while presiding over the state senate in his first year as lieutenant governor from "inflammation of the brain". John Caldwell is the namesake of Caldwell County, Kentucky.

Military contributions
John Caldwell was not only a statesman but an accomplished soldier, Who had fought in the Revolutionary war as well as helped led a campaign against Native American tribes with George Roger Clark in 1786. He had served in the Battle of Fallen Timbers serving under General Anthony Wayne. In one hour General Anthony and Caldwell managed to defeat 2,000 Natives, allowing for what is now Ohio to be settled. The battle allowed Ohio to eventually become a state in 1803.

Political appointments
Before John Caldwell became the 2nd lieutenant Governor of Kentucky, he was Nelson counties first state senator in 1792. After this he and Reverend Terah Templin set out to expand westward and would found Logan county which would eventually become Christian county later that year. On July 16, 1798 John Caldwell was appointed by President John Quincy Adams to serve as commissioner of Christian county. In 1804 He ran for Lieutenant Governor of Kentucky and became the first Lieutenant Governor to win via popular vote.

Notes

1757 births
1804 deaths
Lieutenant Governors of Kentucky
Kentucky state senators